Wädenswil railway station is a railway station in Switzerland, situated near to the banks of Lake Zurich in the municipality of Wädenswil in the canton of Zurich. It is located on the Lake Zurich left bank railway line, and is the junction station for the Südostbahn's Wädenswil to Einsiedeln line.

The station is served on the lakeside line by an hourly long-distance InterRegio service between Bern and Chur. It is also served by Zurich S-Bahn services S2, S8 and S25 on the lakeside line, and is the terminus of the S13 on the Wädenswil to Einsiedeln line.

References

External links 
 
 

Railway stations in the canton of Zürich
Swiss Federal Railways stations
Wädenswil